"Sofa Song" is a song by British rock the Kooks and is featured on their debut studio album, Inside In/Inside Out (2006). It was released on 17 October 2005 as the second single from that album, charting at number 28 in the UK Singles Chart.

Songwriting
Luke Pritchard stated in NME that Morrissey (of The Smiths) is one of his heroes and that "Sofa Song" was an attempt to write a song like Morrissey and Johnny Marr used to write during the Smiths' lifetime; a playful melody with a dark underbelly and lyrics.

Track listings
 CD (VSCDT1904)
 "Sofa Song" – 2:15
 "Be Mine" – 2:35

 7-inch (VS1904)
 "Sofa Song" – 2:15
 "Be Mine" - 2:35
 "Something to Say" – 2:41

 DVD (VSDVD1904)
 "Sofa Song" (video) – 2:21
 "Eddie's Gun" (video) – 2:14
 "Put Your Back to My Face"

Charts

References

The Kooks songs
2005 singles
2005 songs
Song recordings produced by Tony Hoffer
Virgin Records singles